The A1085 is a road that runs from Middlesbrough to Marske-by-the-Sea in the former county of Cleveland. There is a long straight part of the road whilst it passes the former ICI Wilton plant towards Redcar, this part of the road is the main road towards Redcar from the west and towards Middlesbrough and the A66 from the east. It is 11.3 miles (18.2 km) long.

References 

Roads in England